Kannur Rajan (24 June 1940 – 7 April 1995) was a music composer from Kerala, India. Though his songs are less in numbers, they are noted as emotional and nostalgic in the Malayalam film songs. He was the father-in-law of currently famous music director / singer, Sharreth.

Early life 
Kannur Rajan was born in a poor family in Kakkad near Kannur. He entered Malayalam cinema in 1974 with his first music composition for the film Mister Sundary. He then composed films for around 50 films, working with all major lyricists and singers of Malayalam film industry. He was married twice. He had 2 sons in the first marriage. Then he married Vilasini and had three children. He died suddenly due to a massive heart attack while composing for a film titled 'Kokkarakko' on 7 April 1995, aged 55. Malayalam film director K. K. Haridas was his brother in law.

Filmography

Albums
 Hridayanjali (1983)
 Ragaveena (1984)
 Swathanthrya Samara Gatha (1985) -Two songs
 Karvarnan (1992)
 Sreerama Ganamrutham (1992)
 Sruthilaya Tharangini (1993)
 Krishnanamam (1995)

External links 
 raaga.com

References 

Malayalam film score composers
Musicians from Kannur
1995 deaths
1937 births
Film musicians from Kerala
20th-century Indian composers